The SHOT Show , which is an acronym for "Shooting, Hunting and Outdoor Trade Show", is an American annual trade show for the shooting sports, hunting, outdoor recreations and firearm manufacturing industries.  The show is owned and sponsored by the National Shooting Sports Foundation (NSSF), and is the biggest event of the type in the world along with the IWA & OutdoorClassics ("IWA Nuremberg") held also annually in Nuremberg, Germany.  The SHOT Show is restricted to formal members of the shooting, hunting, military and outdoor trade industries, including commercial buyers and sellers of military, law enforcement and tactical products, and is not open to the general public.

The first ever SHOT Show was held in St. Louis, Missouri, in 1979. It used to rotate between Las Vegas, Nevada; Orlando, Florida; New Orleans, Louisiana, and several other U.S. cities, although since 2010 it has taken place only in Las Vegas at the Sands Expo and is contracted to remain there through 2027.  It attracted over 60,000 attendees to its  of exhibition space in Las Vegas. It is among the top 25 trade shows in the US.

Locations 
Source for all attendance information:

References

External links

 SHOT Show

Firearm commerce
Trade shows in the United States
Arms fairs
Recurring events established in 1979
1979 establishments in the United States